Danica Joelle Wu (born August 13, 1992) is a Canadian soccer midfielder who currently plays for German Frauen-Bundesliga side MSV Duisburg and played for Ohio State Buckeyes (collegiately) and for the Laval Comets in the W-League and is also a member of the Canada women's national soccer team.

Early life

Ohio State University 
As a freshman in 2010
 played 24 matches, started in 21 matches
 scored two goals and made 2 assists
 Big Ten All-Freshman team
 Ohio State University Scholar-Athlete.

As a sophomore in 2011
 started 22 matches
 scored 2 goals, and made 4 assists
 second team All-Big Ten
 All-Great Lakes Region 
 Academic All-Big Ten 
 Ohio State University Scholar-Athlete.

 As a junior in 2012
 played 12 games after missing the start of the season playing for Canada at the U-20 Women's World Cup and the final six games with a broken leg.
 first team All-Big Ten
 Academic All-Big Ten
 Ohio State University Scholar-Athlete.

Youth playing career
Wu captained Alberta provincial team in Canada Summer Games and was selected to the all-star team during those games. She won a bronze medal with Canada's U17 team at the 2008 CONCACAF Women's Under-17 Championship, and was nominated Canadian U-17 player of the year in 2007 and 2008. She won a silver medal with the U20 team at the 2012 CONCACAF Women's Under-20 Championship, and was nominated Canadian U-20 player of the year in 2012. Wu played in all three group-stage matches team Canada played in 2012 FIFA U-20 Women's World Cup. Noted by the FIFA U-20 Women's World Cup Technical Study Group as "playmaker with great vision, good ball recovery and distribution skills, hard-working player in defence and attack".

International
Wu made her debut for the Canada women's national soccer team on June 2, 2013, against the United States, at BMO Field in Toronto. The match was referred to as a rematch of a 2012 Olympics semi-final match.

Personal
Wu speaks English and Cantonese. Her father was born in Hong Kong while her mother was born in Medicine Hat, Alberta. She grew up participating in skiing, snowboarding, taekwondo, hockey and swimming. Wu attended Ohio State University beginning in 2010, and has graduated.

References

External links
 
 
 OhioStateBuckeyes.com – Danica Wu
 Laval Cometes – Danica Wu

1992 births
Living people
Canadian people of Hong Kong descent
Canadian sportspeople of Chinese descent
Women's association football midfielders
Canadian expatriate women's soccer players
Canadian women's soccer players
Canada women's international soccer players
Soccer players from Edmonton
MSV Duisburg (women) players
Expatriate women's footballers in Germany
Canadian expatriate sportspeople in the United States
Canadian expatriate sportspeople in Germany
Ohio State Buckeyes women's soccer players
Frauen-Bundesliga players
Ottawa Fury (women) players
USL W-League (1995–2015) players
Laval Comets players